In Turkey, the Directorate of Communications was established with the Presidential Decree No. 14, published in the Official Gazette No. 30488 dated 24 July 2018. It replaced the now-defunct Press, Publishing and Information General Management and is affiliated with the Office of the President of Turkey. Among its duties are directing the country's foreign promotion activities, and managing promotional efforts of the state.

With its main objective aimed towards "strengthening the Turkish brand", the directorate undertakes actions on behalf of the public to offer a qualified representation of Turkey in both national and international level.

List of presidents

References 

Government agencies of Turkey